Quintus Servilius Caepio was a Roman patrician, statesman and soldier. He was the son of Quintus Servilius Caepio who was consul in 106 BC and who lost his army during the Battle of Arausio (Caepio the Younger served under his father at Arausio). He was elected praetor some time in the last 90s BC and fought for Rome during the Social War. He was killed in the second year of the war while fighting the Marsi by Quintus Poppaedius Silo.

Biography

Early life
Caepio was the son of Quintus Servilius Caepio. He had two sisters, Servilia who married Quintus Lutatius Catulus, and another Servilia who married Marcus Livius Drusus. His mother was likely a daughter of Quintus Caecilius Metellus Macedonicus.

Career
Caepio served as quaestor in 103 or possibly 100. Previously his father had been tried before the people by the tribune Gaius Norbanus for his catastrophic loss at the Battle of Arausio; he was convicted and banished. In his quaestorship the younger Caepio used violence to oppose Lucius Appuleius Saturninus, a tribune of the plebs and a political ally of Norbanus, in Saturninus' attempt to pass a bill to sell grain at a deeply discounted price to the Roman people. In his role as  he issued coins with the inscription  ('for the purchase of grain by order of the senate'), implying senate sponsorship of the grain law. Caepio was later brought to trial around 95 BC on maiestas charges from actions as quaestor, but – defended by Lucius Licinius Crassus – he was acquitted.

In 92 BC, Caepio prosecuted Marcus Aemilius Scaurus, the eminent , for alleged provincial extortion and taking bribes from Mithridates VI of Pontus. Scaurus filed a counter-suit against Caepio; eventually, both men were acquitted. Scaurus was apparently driven by the experience of the affair to side with Caepio's former brother-in-law, Livius Drusus, who was to be tribune in 91 BC. Broughton assigns a supposed praetorship to Caepio in (possibly) 91, but Sumner disputes this, saying there's no evidence that he held the office. 

Caepio became a chief opponent of Marcus Livius Drusus' legislative programme for 91, which included laws aimed at giving full citizenship to the Italians and reform the jury pool for various criminal trials. In this he was aided by the then-consul Lucius Marcius Philippus. Pliny (NH 33.20) said that the dispute between the two started many years earlier because of a golden ring. Caepio, it was rumoured, was even involved in the assassination of Drusus, an event commonly seen by ancient sources as starting the Social War.

Early in 90 BC, Caepio initiated a suit with Quintus Varius Severus against Marcus Aemilius Scaurus for a second time but left to serve as legate in the Social War. Regardless, the suit against Scaurus was unsuccessful. During the Social War, Caepio served as a legate under the consul Publius Rutilius Lupus fighting the northern group of rebels. He defeated the Paeligni, a rebel tribe related to the Marruncini. After the death of Lupus he was made joint-commander of Rome's northern army with Gaius Marius. Marius had expected sole command and he did not get along with Caepio with disastrous results. After having dealt with a raiding legion of Marsi at Varnia, Caepio attempted to give Marius instructions, but Marius ignored them. Caepio was left on his own and was then obliged to move his legions back towards Caeoli. Once they reached the Arno at Sublaqueum they were tricked into leaving a secure position and attacked by the Marsi. 

Caepio's army was massacred, with Caepio being killed by the Marsi leader, Quintus Poppaedius Silo.

Family 
He likely had a son named Quintus from an early marriage to an unknown woman. Caepio later married Livia, sister of Marcus Livius Drusus, around 100 BC. Caepio and Livia had three children: Servilia, the mistress of Julius Caesar, mother of Brutus, and mother-in-law of Gaius Cassius Longinus; another daughter Servilia Minor; and a son, Gnaeus Servilius Caepio.

Caepio divorced Livia  97 BC after falling out with her brother. Livia subsequently remarried in c. 96 BC to Marcus Porcius Cato: their children were Marcus (the famous Cato the Younger) and Porcia. Both Livia and Porcius Cato died .  As a result, all of Livia's children (including those by Caepio) grew up in the household of Livius Drusus, until the latter's assassination in 91 BC.

In fiction
Caepio appears as a major character in The First Man in Rome and The Grass Crown, the first two books of Colleen McCullough's Masters of Rome series. Plot points include Caepio's efforts to launder the Gold of Tolosa, which his father stole, and his opposition to Drusus's efforts to enfranchise Rome's Italian allies. This fictional Caepio is depicted as being divorced from Livia because of his cruelty towards her, rather than for purely political reasons.

See also
 Servilia gens

References

 Sources 
 
 
 
 
 

90 BC deaths
1st-century BC executions
1st-century BC Romans
Ancient Roman generals
Roman quaestors
Senators of the Roman Republic
Quintus
Year of birth unknown